Pharco Football Club, is an Egyptian football club based in Alexandria, Egypt. The club is related to the pharmaceutical company, Pharco Corporation, which was founded in 1983.

History
The club used to play in the Egyptian Second Division starting from the 2014–15 season, the second-highest league in the Egyptian football league system. However, Pharco were promoted to the 2021–22 Egyptian Premier League for the first time in their history, as they finished top of their group in the 2020–21 Egyptian Second Division.

Current squad

References

External links
Official Website
Pharco FC on Soccerway

Egyptian Second Division
Association football clubs established in 2010
2010 establishments in Egypt
Football clubs in Alexandria